Sabukawa Dam  is a gravity dam located in Miyazaki Prefecture in Japan. The dam is used for power production. The catchment area of the dam is 76.2 km2. The dam impounds about 6  ha of land when full and can store 716 thousand cubic meters of water. The construction of the dam was started on 1960 and completed in 1963.

See also
List of dams in Japan

References

Dams in Miyazaki Prefecture
Dams completed in 1963
1963 establishments in Japan